Norway competed at the 1936 Summer Olympics in Berlin, Germany. 70 competitors, 68 men and 2 women, took part in 43 events in 12 sports.

Medalists

Gold
 Willy Røgeberg — Shooting, Men's Small-bore Rifle, prone

Silver
 Henry Tiller — Boxing, Men's Middleweight
 Karsten Konow, Fredrik Meyer, Vaadjuv Nyqvist, and Alf Tveten — Sailing, Men's 6 Meter Class 
 John Ditlev-Simonsen, Tit Ditlev-Simonsen, Magnus Konow, Lauritz Schmidt, Hans Struksnæs, Jacob Tullin Thams, and Nordahl Wallem — Sailing, Men's 8 Meter Class

Bronze
 Erling Nilsen — Boxing, Men's Heavyweight
 Arne Brustad, Nils Eriksen, Odd Frantzen, Sverre Hansen, Rolf Holmberg, Øivind Holmsen, Fredrik Horn, Magnar Isaksen, Henry "Tippen" Johansen, Jørgen Juve, Reidar Kvammen, Alf Martinsen, Magdalon Monsen, and Frithjof Ulleberg — Football (soccer), Men's Team Competition

Athletics

Boxing

Canoeing

Cycling

Two male cyclists represented Norway in 1936.

Sprint
 Haakon Sandtorp

Time trial
 Harry Haraldsen

Diving

Equestrian

Fencing

Five fencers, all men, represented Norway in 1936.

Men's foil
 Jens Frølich
 Johan Falkenberg
 Nils Jørgensen

Men's team foil
 Nils Jørgensen, Jens Frølich, Johan Falkenberg, Thorstein Guthe

Men's épée
 Egill Knutzen
 Thorstein Guthe

Football

Rowing

Norway had one rower participate in one out of seven rowing events in 1936.

 Men's single sculls
 Carl Christiansen

Sailing

Shooting

Four shooters represented Norway in 1936. Willy Røgeberg won the gold medal in the 50 m rifle event.

25 m rapid fire pistol
 Hans Aasnæs

50 m pistol
 Mauritz Amundsen

50 m rifle, prone
 Willy Røgeberg
 Mauritz Amundsen
 Hakon Aasnæs

Wrestling

Olaf Knudsen
Arild Dahl
Ivar Stokke

References

External links
Official Olympic Reports
International Olympic Committee results database

Nations at the 1936 Summer Olympics
1936
1936 in Norwegian sport